Borowiec may refer to the following places in Poland:

Borowiec, Greater Poland Voivodeship (west-central Poland)
Borówiec, Greater Poland Voivodeship
Borowiec, Łęczyca County in Łódź Voivodeship (central Poland)
Borowiec, Piotrków County in Łódź Voivodeship (central Poland)
Borowiec, Radomsko County in Łódź Voivodeship (central Poland)
Borowiec, Wieluń County in Łódź Voivodeship (central Poland)
Borowiec, Lublin Voivodeship (east Poland)
Borowiec, Lubusz Voivodeship (west Poland)
Borowiec, Lipsko County in Masovian Voivodeship (east-central Poland)
Borowiec, Piaseczno County in Masovian Voivodeship (east-central Poland)
Borowiec, Gmina Kartuzy in Pomeranian Voivodeship (north Poland)
Borowiec, Gmina Sulęczyno in Pomeranian Voivodeship (north Poland)
Borowiec, Gmina Żukowo in Pomeranian Voivodeship (north Poland)
Borowiec, Końskie County in Świętokrzyskie Voivodeship (south-central Poland)
Borowiec, Włoszczowa County in Świętokrzyskie Voivodeship (south-central Poland)
Borowiec, Warmian-Masurian Voivodeship (north Poland)
Borowiec, Choszczno County in West Pomeranian Voivodeship (north-west Poland)
Borowiec, Koszalin County in West Pomeranian Voivodeship (north-west Poland)

Polish-language surnames